Aklan Governor's Cup is an annual amateur basketball league which is usually dubbed under the name of the incumbent governor of Aklan. The league is one of the sports program of the province that aims to produce another basketball player that can play at the center stage of the Philippine Basketball Association. Wynne Arboleda, one of the superstars in the PBA, is a product of this program.

Teams

Champions

Note: Records from 1995-2008 could not be retrieved.

Tournament Format

Three teams with the best records from each group will advance to the quarterfinals following the single round elimination. The top two teams will enjoy the twice-to-beat advantage in the Final Four. The winners in the semifinals meet in the best-of-3 championship series.

Notable players
Wynne Arboleda (5'11" PG):The first Aklanon to play in the PBA. He is  one of the veteran members of the Air21 Express.
Ricky Ricafuente (5'11" PG): Played for Thailand Cobras of the Asean Basketball League and Trace Laguna Stallions of Liga Pilipinas.
Joey Alacar (6'4" C): One of the dominant centers in the league. Played for Banga and Kalibo.
Donald Delfin (6'4" C/PF): A former member of the St.Francis of Assissi College Doves of UCAA.
Samuel Ignacio (6'4" C/PF): An MVP of the league and led Numancia to four(4) Championships.
JayMar Marte (6'1" SF):
Romeo Molo (6'1" F):
JR Manuel (6'3" C): The 2012 League MVP.
Rodney Sazon (6'5" C): A member of the FEU Tamaraws Team B.

References

Basketball competitions in the Philippines
Sports in Aklan